The Kensington by-election, in Kensington, on 14 July 1988 was held after the death of Conservative Member of Parliament (MP) Brandon Rhys-Williams. Normally a relatively safe Conservative seat, it was narrowly won by Dudley Fishburn, who would retain the seat in 1992.

It was the first by-election of that parliament, which had begun after the general election of June 1987, and would last until the next election in April 1992.

Candidates
John Connell was a peace advocate who opposed what he saw as manipulation of the news by ITN.
John Crowley described himself as  an 'Anti Yuppie Revolutionary Crowleyist, Vegetarian Visionary'.
John Duignan was a supporter of the Class War organisation.
Roy Edey called for equal redistribution of wealth and a policy of social housing construction.
Dudley Fishburn was a former editor of The Economist.
William Goodhart was a leading human rights lawyer who has since taken a seat in the House of Lords.
Brian Goodier described himself as an 'Anti-Left Wing Fascist'.
Phylip Hobson was the Green Party candidate.
Ann Holmes was again a candidate for this seat in the 1992 general election. and subsequently became a councillor in the City of London.
John Martin was a candidate for the dissident wing of the SDP that had rejected membership of the Social and Liberal Democrats.
Thomas McDermott was the founder of the Free Trade Liberal Party and campaigned on a platform of the UK leaving the European Community.
Cynthia Payne, who had been convicted of controlling a brothel, ran under the 'Rainbow Alliance Payne and Pleasure Party' banner.
William Scola represented his own 'Leveller Party'.
Screaming Lord Sutch was the leader and founder of the Official Monster Raving Loony Party.
Kailash Trivedi ran as candidate for the 'Janata Party' (Peoples Party in Hindi and the name of a former governing party in India), his own creation.

Results

The results for the previous election were:

References

External links
Campaign literature from the by-election
Full results

Kensington by-election
Kensington by-election
Kensington,1988
Kensington,1988
Kensington by-election
20th century in the Royal Borough of Kensington and Chelsea